Birkur is located in Kamareddy district on the Manjeera riverbed.

Demographics 
There is a population of approximately 25,000.

Economy 
Birkur's major economy is agrarian (85%) in nature.  The rest is small businesses, the public and the private service sector.

Schools 
Birkur has a Govt. High School and some private secondary schools.

Transportation 
Birkur is well connected by TSRTC with cities and towns like Nizamabad, Bodhan, Banswada, Kotagiri.
A Number of auto rickshaws are more than buses

Crops 
Birkur is home for many types of crops like Paddy, Sugarcane, sunflower, peanuts (groundnuts), soybean, vegetables and fruits.

History 
Prior to the merge with India after independence in 1947,it was ruled by the local king. 

Cities and towns in Nizamabad district